Carl Harry Stefan Johansson (born 17 June 1998) is a Swedish professional footballer who plays as a winger for Eerste Divisie club VVV-Venlo.

Club career

Early years
Johansson started playing football for hometown club Blomstermåla IK as a six-year-old. As a 14-year-old, he moved to Oskarshamns AIK's youth department. Johansson made two appearances for Oskarshamn in Ettan Södra in 2014. In December 2014, he was named "Elmare of the Year", an award that goes to a Smålandian athlete who sets a positive example on and off the field.

Kalmar FF
In January 2015, Johansson signed with Kalmar FF competing in the top level Allsvenskan. Prior to the 2016 season, he was promoted to the first team and extended his contract until 2018. He scored his first goal for Kalmar, which proved to be the winner, in a 1–0 victory against IF Elfsborg on 5 March 2016 in Svenska Cupen. Johansson made his Allsvenskan debut on 6 April 2016 in a 4–1 loss against IFK Norrköping. He scored his first Allsvenskan goal on 10 April 2016 in a 3–2 win over IF Elfsborg.

Östers IF
In January 2018, Johansson sent on a season-long loan to Superettan club Östers IF for the 2018 season. 

On 10 February 2019, Johansson signed a permanent deal with Östers IF, penning a three-year contract. Johansson made a total of 111 appearances for the club between 2018 and 2021, scoring 16 goals.

VVV-Venlo
In August 2021, Johansson signed with recently relegated Dutch Eerste Divisie club VVV-Venlo. He made his debut on the first matchday of the 2021–22 season, replacing Joeri Schroyen in the 59th minute of a 2–2 home draw against NAC Breda. On 9 October 2021, he scored his first goal for the club in the Limburgian derby against MVV Maastricht, securing a late 2–0 win.

Personal life
Johansson is the nephew of former Swedish international footballers Benno Magnusson and Roger Magnusson.

Career statistics

Club

References

External links
 
 

1998 births
People from Mönsterås Municipality
Living people
Swedish footballers
Association football midfielders
Sweden youth international footballers
Sweden under-21 international footballers
Kalmar FF players
Östers IF players
Oskarshamns AIK players
VVV-Venlo players
Allsvenskan players
Superettan players
Eerste Divisie players
Swedish expatriate footballers
Expatriate footballers in the Netherlands
Swedish expatriate sportspeople in the Netherlands
Sportspeople from Kalmar County
Ettan Fotboll players